Marián Ostrčil (born 15 October 1980 in Bratislava) is a Slovak sprint canoer who has been competing since 1998.

In 1998, in Nyköping, Sweden, he became European junior champion in the individual Canadian canoe (C-1) 500m. In 2002 he won the European under-23 championship in Zagreb, Croatia in the same event.

At the ICF Canoe Sprint World Championships, Ostrčil won two medals with one silver (C-1 1000 m: 2007) and one bronze (C-1 5000 m: 2010). Competing in two Summer Olympics, he earned his best finish of seventh in the C-1 1000 m event at Athens in 2004.

Ostrčil is 190 cm (6'3") tall and weighs 90 kg (198 lbs). He is a member of the AŠK Dukla club in Trenčín where he is coached by Atlanta silver medallist Slavomír Kňazovický.

References

Sports-reference.com profile

1980 births
Canoeists at the 2004 Summer Olympics
Canoeists at the 2008 Summer Olympics
Living people
Olympic canoeists of Slovakia
Slovak male canoeists
Sportspeople from Bratislava
ICF Canoe Sprint World Championships medalists in Canadian